The General Motors G platform (also called G-Body) automobile platform designation was used for front-wheel drive full-sized and luxury cars between 1995 and 2011.

Previously, General Motors used the G-body designation for unrelated mid-sized cars.

The G-body was based on Cadillac's K-body architecture. The platform was introduced in 1995 with Buick Riviera 2-door coupe (which moved up from the GM E platform) and the Oldsmobile Aurora 4-door sedan (a new model that replaced the Riviera-derived Toronado).  By the turn of the millennium, full-sized cars from four different GM makes were using some derivative of the platform.

Platform consolidation
Starting with the 1997 Buick Park Avenue, GM consolidated its four large-car platforms; C platform, K platform, H platform, and G platform; all to the G platform. However, GM decided to retain their previous platform designations. These legacy platform designations were used in the VIN number and official GM publications. Models designated as "G" went out of production for MY (Model Year) 1999, but successor models were sold until MY 2011. 

The G-body had an extremely resilient structure. For its time, the G-body was one of the strongest unibody car frames in production (25 Hz). This fact did not go untouted as GM literature made much of the need to use a 'frame crusher' designed to test heavy-duty truck frames to finally break the G-body structure in their crush-to-failure procedures. Vehicles built on the G platform are also noted for having belt-in-seat style seat belts like the mid-size GMT360 SUVs.  The G-body also featured four-wheel independent suspension with a MacPherson strut style front suspension and a semi-trailing arm style rear suspension that utilized aluminum control arms. All-new aluminum control arms were introduced for the front suspension for 1998.  The handling was further enhanced with standard front and rear stabilizer bars and lateral links in the rear suspension to further control wheel toe.

Vehicles 1995-2005

* Official designation given by GM, despite using a G platform-derivative. This name also corresponds to the 4th letter in the VIN of the vehicle.

2006 Revision
The G platform was updated for the 2006 model year.  The final car using this platform was the Buick Lucerne, which ended production in June 2011.

Vehicles

* Official designation given by GM, despite using a G platform-derivative. This name also corresponds to the 4th letter in the VIN of the vehicle.

References

List of GM VIN codes

G 2